May 3rd Films is a film and television production company founded in 2003 by noted filmmaker Kirk Fraser.

History
May 3rd Films feature documentary debut, The Life of Rayful Edmond. was released to high acclaims and considered by critics as a success. Following the success of true-crime stories, pre-production started the Winter of 2006  on the life of Len Bias. During the 2008 Sundance Film Festival the Len Bias film was promoted with a guerilla marketing tactics that landed a deal with ESPN. In 2009 the Len Bias film won the Jury Prize for Best Documentary at the 13th Annual American Black Film Festival. The titled was later changed to Without Bias and aired as part of ESPN documentary 30 for 30 series. May 3rd Films also has produced several television shows for Black Entertainment Television, Fox Sports Networks, TV One, and ESPN.

List of Films by May 3rd Films
 The Life of Rayful Edmond (2005)
 30 for 30 Without Bias (2009)

List of Television Shows by May 3rd Films
 American Gangster (2006-2008) TV Series
 Lil' Kim: Countdown to Lockdown (2006) TV Series
 Party Boyz (2009) TV Special

List of Webisode by May 3rd Films
 Mayor For Life (2010) Web Series

Awards and nominations

References

External links
 

Mass media companies established in 2003
Film production companies of the United States